Macrosoma muscerdata is a moth-like butterfly in the family Hedylidae. It was described by Cajetan von Felder, Rudolf Felder and Alois Friedrich Rogenhofer in 1875.

References

Hedylidae
Butterflies described in 1875